The Asian Surfing Championships is an association that promotes the sport of surfing in Asia through the organization of competitions.

History 

The Asian Surfing Championships was created in 2011. They are headquartered in Bali and led by Tipi Jabrik. ASC promotes surfing in Asian countries and helps other countries establish events. The Championship develops the skills of surfers through competition, brings media attention to formerly unfamiliar regions and aids in the advancement of surfing locally, regionally and internationally. ASC works with local, national and multinational event sponsors, maximizing the results of competitive surfing events. Every year during a multi-national surfing tour, Asian Surfing Champions are crowned in multiple divisions: Open, Women, Longboard, Junior and Master.

In 2014, the group organized an awards trip to G-Land, filmed by Indo Inc Productions.

ASC Tour schedules

Champions by category

2013

2012

2011

References

External links

External links

Surfing competitions
Sport in Asia
Recurring sporting events established in 2011